Mahesh Bhupathi and Leander Paes were the defending champions but they competed with different partners that year, Bhupathi with Todd Woodbridge and Paes with David Rikl.

Paes and Rikl lost in the quarterfinals to Tomáš Cibulec and Ota Fukárek.

Bhupathi and Woodbridge lost in the semifinals to František Čermák and Leoš Friedl.

Julian Knowle and Michael Kohlmann won in the final 7–6(7–1), 7–6(7–3) against Čermák and Friedl.

Seeds

  Mahesh Bhupathi /  Todd Woodbridge (semifinals)
  Leander Paes /  David Rikl (quarterfinals)
  Petr Pála /  Pavel Vízner (first round)
  František Čermák /  Leoš Friedl (final)

Draw

External links
 2003 Tata Open Doubles Draw

2003 Tata Open
Doubles
Maharashtra Open